Christ on the Cross, Christ between Two Thieves or Calvary is an 1835 painting by Eugène Delacroix. 

It was exhibited at the 1835 Paris Salon, after which it was bought for the French state for 2,000 francs and assigned to Morbihan. It was then exhibited at the church of Saint-Patern in Vannes, where the curé had the breast of Mary Magdalene overpainted and the work hung out of sight in the bell tower. The painting was restored in 1864 and the following year moved to its present home at the Musée de la Cohue, also in Vannes.

References

1835 paintings
Paintings by Eugène Delacroix
Delacroix
Paintings of the Virgin Mary
Paintings depicting Mary Magdalene
Skulls in art